Mohamed Boussefiane (born January 18, 1985 in Khemis Miliana) is an Algerian footballer.

He has been capped by Algeria at the Under-20, Under-21 level and Under-23 level. He was a member of the Algeria team at the 2005 Mediterranean Games in Almeria, Spain and  2005 Islamic Games in Jeddah, Saudi Arabia.

References

1985 births
Algerian footballers
Algerian Ligue Professionnelle 1 players
Algerian Ligue 2 players
Algeria youth international footballers
Algeria under-23 international footballers
People from Aïn Defla Province
AS Khroub players
JS Kabylie players
Living people
NA Hussein Dey players
Olympique de Médéa players
RC Kouba players
USM Alger players
Association football forwards
Competitors at the 2005 Mediterranean Games
Mediterranean Games competitors for Algeria
21st-century Algerian people